In Search of the Miraculous: Fragments of an Unknown Teaching is a 1949 book by Russian philosopher P. D. Ouspensky which recounts his meeting and subsequent association with George Gurdjieff.

According to Sophia Wellbeloved, the book is generally regarded as the most comprehensive account of Gurdjieff's system of thought ever published, as it often forms the basis from which Gurdjieff and his teachings are understood.

Editions
 In Search of the Miraculous: The Definitive Exploration of G. I. Gurdjieff's Mystical Thought and Universal View, Harvest Book; New edition, 2001. .

"In Search of the Miraculous - 
August 2010 - identical copy of first hardback edition.
Paul H. Crompton Ltd.

See also
Fragments of an Unknown Teaching (music inspired by the book)

References

External links
 In Search of the Miraculous'' Synopsis & Book Download (PDF)
 
 A synopsis by Jacob Needleman originally presented at the 1980 national meetings of the American Academy of Religion.

1949 non-fiction books
New religious movements in popular culture
Philosophy books
Self-help books
Fourth Way
Books by P. D. Ouspensky
Books about spirituality
George Gurdjieff
Harcourt (publisher) books